Ricardo Antonio Piccinini (born 7 September 1949) is an Argentinian-born Guatemalan footballer. After his naturalization in 1975, he competed at the 1976 Summer Olympics and the 1988 Summer Olympics. His appearance in the latter at the age of 39 makes him the oldest footballer to ever play in the Olympics.

Career

Honours

Domestic honours
 Liga Nacional de Guatemala 
 Comunicaciones: 1977-78, 1979–80
 Suchitepéquez: 1983
 Municipal: 1987, 1988–89, 1989–90

Continental honours
 CONCACAF Champions' Cup
 Comunicaciones:  1978

References

External links
 

1949 births
Living people
Guatemalan footballers
Guatemala international footballers
Olympic footballers of Guatemala
Footballers at the 1976 Summer Olympics
Footballers at the 1988 Summer Olympics
People from Avellaneda
Association football goalkeepers
Comunicaciones F.C. players
C.S.D. Municipal players
Xelajú MC players
Tipografía Nacional players
Naturalized citizens of Guatemala